Bader Al-Enezi (born 31 July 1999) is a Saudi Arabian professional footballer who plays as a goalkeeper for Pro League side Al-Tai.

Club career
Al-Enezi started his career at Al-Tai. He signed his first professional contract with the club on 16 June 2019. He made his first-team debut on 20 September 2020 against Al-Taqadom in the final league match of the 2019–20 season. On 21 March 2021, Al-Enezi renewed his contract with Al-Tai for another two years. In the 2020–21 season, Al-Enezi started the final six league matches as Al-Tai earned promotion to the Pro League for the first time since 2008. He made his Pro League debut on 3 November coming off the bench in the league match against Al-Raed.

References

External links
 

1999 births
Living people
Association football goalkeepers
Saudi Arabian footballers
Saudi Arabia youth international footballers
Al-Tai FC players
Saudi First Division League players
Saudi Professional League players